Ijeoma Grace Agu  is a Nigerian actress. She received a best supporting actress nomination at the 12th Africa Movie Academy Awards. She also won most promising actress at the 2014 Best of Nollywood Awards. In 2007, she made her first screen appearance in Eldorado TV series. She was also part of the cultural group at 2012 London Olympic Games.

Personal life 
Agu is the first of her parents' five children. According to a report in Pulse Nigeria, she was raised in Benin City and Lagos State. She had her first degree in biochemistry from Nnamdi Azikiwe University in 2007. She is married with a daughter. She describes her dad as being responsible for instilling the confidence of acting into her. According to Agu, her acting career started on stage in Benin at the age of 14. Speaking to The Nation (Nigeria) on homosexuality in Nollywood, Agu describes the act as a sin on religious grounds and didn't think its outlaw was an infringement of human rights. However, she commented that they shouldn't be criminalized as its being done in Nigeria and she would gladly accept the role of a lesbian in a film. She also asserts that she does not support anything that will result in the loss of lives of Nigerians, when asked about the agitation for Biafra and imprisonment of Nnamdi Kanu.

Filmography 
The Arrangement
Beyond Blood

One Room
The Choice of Aina
Flower Girl
From Within 
Just Not Married 
Kpians: The Feast of Souls (2014) 
Taxi Driver
Hoodrush
Misfits
Love In A Time of Kekes
Women Are Scum
Package deal
Simple People
Sylvia
Swallow

See also
 List of Igbo people

References

External links 
 
 Afrinolly Biography

21st-century Nigerian actresses
Actresses from Lagos State
Nigerian film actresses
Living people
Nnamdi Azikiwe University alumni
Year of birth missing (living people)
Igbo actresses